Henry Pierrepont may refer to:

Henry Pierrepont (died 1452), MP for Nottinghamshire
Henry Pierrepont (politician) (1546–1615), MP for Nottinghamshire
Henry Pierrepont, 1st Marquess of Dorchester (1606–1680), English peer
Henry Pierrepont (diplomat) (1780–1851), British diplomat

See also
Henry Pierrepoint (1877–1922), English executioner